The Ilyushin Il-16 (Cyrillic Илью́шин Ил-16) was a Soviet lightweight armored ground-attack aircraft developed at the end of World War II by the Ilyushin Design Bureau. It was in essence a scaled-down version of the Ilyushin Il-10, but was fitted with a newly developed Mikulin AM-43 engine with the expectation that it would be faster and more maneuverable than its predecessor. However, the engine's defects proved to be impossible to rectify and further development was canceled in mid-1946.

Development
The relatively high performance of the Il-10 prompted the development by the Ilyushin design bureau in 1944 of a lighter attack aircraft with greater speed and maneuverability using a more-powerful engine. The Il-16, as the new design was called, was powered by the new liquid-cooled Mikulin AM-43NV engine that delivered  for takeoff. The design of the Il-16 was virtually identical to that of the Il-10, both aerodynamically and structurally, but it was slightly smaller and weighed less. Coupled with the more powerful AM-43 engine, it was expected that Il-16 would be significantly faster than the older aircraft. It used Ilyushin's typical load-bearing armored shell, but the armor was thinner in some places than that of the Il-10.

The Il-16 shared the same wing-mounted pair of  Nudelman-Suranov NS-23 as the Il-10 and added a pair of  ShKAS machine guns in the outer wing panels. The rear gunner was given a  Berezin UB-20. A cassette of ten AG-2 aerial grenades was added to deter pursuing fighters.

The exact number of prototypes built is not clear, some sources say three, but at least two appear to have been built, based on photographic evidence. The prototype was first flown in 1945 and the engine's torque, coupled with the short rear fuselage, resulted in poor longitudinal stability characteristics. To correct the problem the second prototype had the rear fuselage lengthened , the area of the vertical tail was increased and the rudder was given a trim tab. These changes were successful in improving the aircraft's flight characteristics, but the engine proved troublesome and prolonged flight testing into 1946. Its problems proved intractable and the program was canceled in the summer of 1946.

Specifications

See also

References

Notes

Bibliography
 

 

1940s Soviet attack aircraft
Il-016
Abandoned military aircraft projects of the Soviet Union
Single-engined tractor aircraft
Aircraft first flown in 1945